Antun Domic is a Chilean-American engineer and mathematician.

Early life and education 
Domic obtained his Ph.D. in Mathematics from the Massachusetts Institute of Technology in 1978, with a dissertation in partial differential equations.

Career 
In 1982, Domic became a member of the technical staff of MIT Lincoln Laboratory in Lexington, MA. While there, Domic and his colleagues developed the Lincoln Boolean Synthesizer.

In 1985, Domic joined Digital Equipment Corporation where one of the EDA tools developed by Domic and his colleagues was CLEO, an automatic layout generator (from schematic) which was used to design blocks of several RISC processors at DEC.

Domic joined Synopsys in 1997 as vice-president of engineering for the Design Tools Group. At the end of 2016, Domic was appointed Synopsys CTO.

Mathematics
In 1987, Domic and Domingo Toledo wrote the paper "The Gromov norm of the Kähler class of symmetric domains" (Mathematische Annalen. 276 no. 3, 425–43).

Awards
Domic is an IEEE Fellow, and the recipient of the 2019 IEEE Robert N. Noyce Medal.

References 

Massachusetts Institute of Technology School of Science alumni
Chilean engineers
Year of birth missing (living people)
20th-century American  mathematicians
Living people